M1941 or M1941 Johnson may refer to:

M1941 Johnson rifle, a semi automatic rifle
M1941 Johnson machine gun, a light machine gun
M1941 Field Jacket, used by U.S. Army soldiers

See also
Melvin Johnson